1994 Júbilo Iwata season

Review and events

League results summary

League results by round

Competitions

Domestic results

J.League

Suntory series

NICOS series

Emperor's Cup

J.League Cup

Player statistics

 † player(s) joined the team after the opening of this season.

Transfers

In:

Out: no data

Transfers during the season

In
Andre Pausu (from FC Twente on February)
Toshihiro Hattori (from Tokai University)
Salvatore Schillaci (from Inter Milano on April)

Out

Awards
none

References

Other pages
 J. League official site
 Júbilo Iwata official site

Jubilo Iwata
Júbilo Iwata seasons